Argusville may refer to:

Places

United States
 Argusville, New York, a hamlet in the Schoharie County towns of Carlisle and Sharon
 Argusville, North Dakota